Pindeshwor Vidyapeeth is one of the affiliated government Sanskrit colleges of Nepal Sanskrit University at Dharan  Sub-Municipality in Sunsari District of Nepal. This campus offers Uttarmadhyama (Intermediate) as well as Shastri (Bachelor) levels of study.

References

Universities and colleges in Nepal
1951 establishments in Nepal